Saints and Strangers is a book by George F Willison published in 1945 by Reynal & Hitchcock, New York.  

Its full title, Saints and Strangers - Being the Lives of the Pilgrim Fathers & Their Families, with Their Friends & Foes: & and Account of Their Posthumous Wanderings in Limbo, Their Final Resurrection & Rise to Glory, & the Strange Pilgrimages of Plymouth Rock, is a fair description of this historical account.   

The book includes an appendix listing names and data of the many "saints and strangers" involved as described in the title.  

A softback edition published by Time-Life Books is commonly found in thrift and used book stores.

References
 Clifford K. Shipton (1946) "Review: Saints and Strangers by Willison", William and Mary Quarterly 3(2): 297–300 

1945 non-fiction books
History books about the United States
American history books
New England Puritanism
Plymouth Colony
Reynal & Hitchcock books